USS Cheng Ho (IX-52) (also written Chengho), an unclassified miscellaneous vessel, was the only ship of the United States Navy of that name, which was given to her by her civilian owner for Zheng He, the Chinese admiral and explorer.

Exploring vessel
The Chinese junk motor yacht was built at the Ah King Shipways, Hong Kong, for Anne Archbold (the daughter of John Dustin Archbold, co-founder of Standard Oil), and launched in October 1939. She was designed and built for a plant collecting expedition to the Dutch East Indies led by botanist David Fairchild. The expedition was intended to last for two years, but after only six months the outbreak of war made further work impossible. Although shortened, the trip was productive. More than 500 different kinds of plants were collected, including more than 90 species of palms.

Navy service
On 14 July 1941 the ship was bought by United States Navy from Mrs. Archbold for the nominal sum of one dollar, and placed in service on 23 July 1941, assigned to the 14th Naval District.

Cheng Ho was at the Section Base, Bishop's Point, during the Japanese attack on Pearl Harbor on 7 December 1941. Throughout World War II she served at Pearl Harbor as a picket boat and as an inshore patrol vessel. She was stricken on 25 February 1946, and turned over to the War Shipping Administration for return to her former owner.

Cheng Ho was last seen in 1990, derelict and beached at Papeete, Tahiti.

Notes

References

External links
 The Voyage of the Cheng Ho
 Photographs of the Cheng Ho expedition

1939 ships
Unclassified miscellaneous vessels of the United States Navy